Denis O'Dea (26 April 1905 – 5 November 1978) was an Irish stage and film actor.

He was born in Dublin and attended Synge Street CBS. When very young he and his mother Kathleen (from County Kerry) moved in with her sister, who kept a boarding house at 54 South Richmond Street. He worked in insurance until taking up acting. O'Dea was a leading member of Dublin's Abbey Theatre where he had a great acting career from 1929 to 1953; a list of his performances can be found in the Abbey archives. He also appeared in numerous plays by Irish playwright Teresa Deevy, some of which toured New York and England. His work led to a number of notable film roles, including two mid-1930s John Ford films, The Informer and The Plough and the Stars (1936), and the part of the police inspector in pursuit of IRA man James Mason in Carol Reed's Odd Man Out (1947).

Other films in which he appeared include The Mark of Cain (1947), The Fallen Idol (1948, again for Reed, and again as a police inspector), Alfred Hitchcock's Under Capricorn (1949), The Bad Lord Byron (1949), Landfall (1949), Marry Me! (1949), Disney's Treasure Island (1950), Captain Horatio Hornblower (1951), The Long Dark Hall (1951), Mogambo (1953; another John Ford film), Niagara (1953), Never Take No for an Answer (1953), The Rising of the Moon (1957), Captain Lightfoot (1957), Darby O'Gill and the Little People (1959), and Esther and the King (1960).

Family
He was married to actress Siobhán McKenna from 1946 until his death in 1978 at the age of 73; they had one son, Donnacha O'Dea, who is a champion swimmer and professional poker player.

Filmography

 Guests of the Nation (1935)
 The Informer (1935) – Street Singer 
 Beloved Enemy (1936) – Sean's I.R.A. Friend (uncredited)
 The Plough and the Stars (1936) – The Covey
 Odd Man Out (1947) – Inspector
 The Mark of Cain (1947) – Sir William Godgrey
 The Fallen Idol (1948) – Inspector Crowe
 The Bad Lord Byron (1949) – Prosecuting Counsel
 Marry Me! (1949) – Saunders
 Under Capricorn (1949) – Mr. Corrigan
 Landfall (1949) – Capt. Burnaby
 Treasure Island (1950) – Dr. Livesey
 The Long Dark Hall (1951) – Sir Charles Morton
 Captain Horatio Hornblower (1951) – RAdm. Sir Rodney Leighton
 Peppino e Violetta (1951) – Father Damico
 Never Take No for an Answer (1951) – Father Damico
 Niagara (1953) – Inspector Starkey
 Sea Devils (1953) – Lethierry
 Mogambo (1953) – Father Josef
 Captain Lightfoot (1955) – Regis Donnell
 The Rising of the Moon (1957) – Police Sergeant Tom O'Hara (3rd Episode)
 The Story of Esther Costello (1957) – Father Devlin
 Darby O'Gill and the Little People (1959) – Father Murphy
 Esther and the King (1960) – Mordecai (final film role)

Playography 

 The Reapers (1930)
 A Disciple (1931)
 Temporal Powers (1932)
 Katie Roche (1937) New York
 Katie Roche (1937) Cambridge, England
 Temporal Powers (1937)
 The King of Spain's Daughter (1938) Dublin
 The King of Spain's Daughter (1939) Cork

References

External links
 
 
 Denis O'Dea at The Teresa Deevy Archive
 Denis O'Dea at The Abbey Theatre Archive

1905 births
1978 deaths
Irish male film actors
Irish male stage actors
Abbey Theatre
People from Portobello, Dublin
20th-century Irish male actors